Semantic primes or semantic primitives are a set of semantic concepts that are argued to be innately understood by all people but impossible to express in simpler terms. They represent words or phrases that are learned through practice but cannot be defined concretely. For example, although the meaning of "touching" is readily understood, a dictionary might define "touch" as "to make contact" and "contact" as "touching", providing no information if neither of these words is understood. The concept of universal semantic primes was largely introduced by Anna Wierzbicka's book, Semantics: Primes and Universals.

List of semantic primes

Table adapted from Levisen and Waters 2017 and Goddard and Wierzbicka 2014.

A universal syntax of meaning
Semantic primes represent universally meaningful concepts, but to have meaningful messages, or statements, such concepts must combine in a way that they themselves convey meaning.  Such meaningful combinations, in their simplest form as sentences, constitute the syntax of the language.  Wierzbicka provides evidence that just as all languages use the same set of semantic primes, they also use the same or very similar syntax.  She states: "I am also positing certain innate and universal rules of syntax – not in the sense of some intuitively unverifiable formal syntax à la Chomsky, but in the sense of intuitively verifiable patterns determining possible combinations of primitive concepts (Wierzbicka, 1996)."  She gives one example comparing the English sentence, "I want to do this", with its equivalent in Russian.  Although she notes certain formal differences between the two sentence structures, their semantic equivalence emerges from the "....equivalence of the primitives themselves and of the rules for their combination."

This work [of Wierzbicka and colleagues] has led to a set of highly concrete proposals about a hypothesized irreducible core of all human languages. This universal core is believed to have a fully ‘language-like’ character in the sense that it consists of a lexicon of semantic primitives together with a syntax governing how the primitives can be combined (Goddard, 1998).

It may not be surprising that all humans today possess a common language core of semantic primes and a more or less universal syntax since there is substantial evidence that all humans today descended from a common speech-enabled male and female Homo sapiens ancestor.   Linguist Johanna Nichols traces Homo sapiens language origin as far back as 130,000 years ago, perhaps only 65,000 years after the earliest Homo sapiens fossil finds (Adler, 2000).  Philosopher G. J. Whitrow expresses it:

....despite the great diversity of existing languages and dialect, the capacity for language appears to be identical in all races. Consequently, we can conclude that man's linguistic ability existed before racial diversification occurred (Whitrow, 1988).

Natural semantic metalanguage

In effect, the combination of a set of semantic primes each representing a different basic concept, residing in minds with a propensity to acquire certain basic concepts, and a common set of rules for combining those concepts into meaningful messages, constitutes a natural semantic prime language, or natural semantic metalanguage.  In English, the natural semantic metalanguage reduces language to a core that enables full development of the English language. A new word can be added as a shorthand substitute for a 'text' in the natural semantic metalanguage, a 'text' that can convey what English speakers mean by lie, by what a person does when he says something not true because he wants someone to think it true.  Any English word can be described (defined) with a text using a primitive lexicon of about 60 words (concepts) in the English natural semantic metalanguage.   Likewise can any complex semantic sentence in English be paraphrased reductively to the core words and syntax of the natural semantic metalanguage.  The texts can make subtle distinctions English-speakers make between happy, glad, joyful, ecstatic, etc., and can supply those distinctions to those who want to know them.

Given the universal nature of the list of semantic primes among languages, and of the grammar, every language has essentially the same natural semantic metalanguage, though each semantic prime sounds different among languages and the appearance of the syntax may differ.  Wierzbicka and colleagues refer to all the natural semantic metalanguages as 'isomorphic' with each other.  Conceivably, if the dictionary of meaning descriptions of each language was reductively paraphrased in the text of its natural semantic metalanguage, and that natural semantic metalanguage was translated to a common natural semantic metalanguage for all natural languages, it would greatly reduce language barriers.

See also 
 Universal grammar
 Core ontology
 Linguistic universal
 Natural semantic metalanguage
 Swadesh list

Notes

References

Adler R. (2000) “Voices from the past” New Scientist, 26 February.
Goddard C. (1998) Bad arguments against semantic primitives.  Theoretical Linguistics 24:129-156.  View/Download PDF of article [Goddard: "....this paper is heterogenous in nature and polemical in purpose...."]
Goddard C. (2002) The search for the shared semantic core of all languages. In Cliff Goddard and Anna Wierzbicka (eds). Meaning and Universal Grammar - Theory and Empirical Findings. Volume I. Amsterdam: John Benjamins. pp. 5–40. View/Download PDF of the book chapter
Goddard C., Wierzbicka A. (eds.) (1994) Semantic and Lexical Universals: Theory and Empirical Findings. Amsterdam: John Benjamins. Publisher’s website’s description of book, with Table of Contents
Whitrow GJ. (1988) Time in History: The evolution of our general awareness of time and temporal perspective. Oxford University Press.  . p. 11.
Wierzbicka A. (1996) Semantics: Primes and Universals. Oxford University Press.  . Publisher's website's description of book Professor Wierzbicka’s faculty webpage Excerpts from Chapters 1 and 2

External links
Goddard C, Wierzbicka A (2007) Semantic Primes and Cultural Scripts in Language Learning and Intercultural Communication. PDF
Goddard, Cliff. 2002. The search for the shared semantic core of all languages. In Cliff Goddard and Anna Wierzbicka (eds). Meaning and Universal Grammar - Theory and Empirical Findings. Volume I. Amsterdam: John Benjamins. pp. 5–40.
The Natural Semantics Metalanguage

Semantics
Pragmatics